Ziyavudin Gadzhievich Magomedov (born 1968) is a Russian billionaire businessman. He is the main owner of the privately-held investment company Summa Group. In March 2018, he was arrested and charged with "racketeering and embezzlement of state funds".

Early life
Ziyavudin Magomedov was born in 1968 in Makhachkala, Dagestan. In 1993 he earned a bachelor's degree in international economics from Moscow State University.

Career 
From 1994 to 1998, Magomedov was the President of IFC - Interfinance.

In 2006, "Slavia" controlled by Magomedov, bought 76% of shares of "Yakutgazprom" for 628.5 million rubles. In 2006, "Summa Telecom" controlled by Magomedov and his brother, Magomed, received frequencies in the 2.5-2.7 GHz band for the provision of wireless technology WiMax throughout Russia, but there were problems with the use of those frequencies.

In 2010, he became the representative of Russia in APEC and in 2012 Chairman of ABAC, the APEC Business Advisory Council.

In January 2011, Magomedov with "Transneft" acquired company Kadina Ltd, which owned the majority (50.1%) of NCSP. In 2016 Ziyavudin bought MMA promotion Fight Nights Global and made the commercial company "Eagles MMA" for sponsoring MMA fighters.

In the 2011 Finance magazine list, he had an estimated net worth of US$3 billion.

In 2012 Magomedov's Summa Group bought a 50% minus one share stake in the United Grain Company. In 2014, the company agreed to trade grain worth $500 million for oil with Iran.

Civic activities
Since October 2010, he is the chairman of board of trustees of the Russian Tennis Federation.

2018 arrest
On 31 March 2018, while preparing to flee to the United States, Magomedov was arrested and charged with "racketeering and embezzlement of state funds" by Ministry of Internal Affairs of Russia. Magomedov denies the charges, but a Moscow court ruled on 31 March 2018 that he will remain in pre-trial custody, without bail, until 30 May 2018. His detention was later extended until November 2018. As of September 2022 he is still in jail.

Awards 
 Medal of Honour (Russia) (18 April 2012)
 Presidential Certificate of Merit for his work on renovating the Bolshoi Theatre (2012)
 Order of Friendship (Russia) (March 2010)

Personal life
Magomedov is married, with three children, and lives in Moscow.

References

Avar people
Russian billionaires
Russian businesspeople in the oil industry
1968 births
Living people
People from Makhachkala
Russian people of Dagestani descent
Moscow State University alumni